Randolph County Airport (I22) is a public airport  east of Winchester, in Randolph County, Indiana. The airport was founded in June 1948.

References

External links 

 http://randolphcounty.us/departments/airport
 http://www.airnav.com/airport/I22

Airports in Indiana
Transportation buildings and structures in Randolph County, Indiana